Instituto Cumbres México is a private catholic school for boys. It is located in Colonia Lomas de Vista Hermosa, Cuajimalpa, Mexico City. It serves elementary school through high school. It is a part of the Cumbres Institute network of schools and is affiliated with the Legion of Christ.

It is affiliated with Instituto Rosedal Vista Hermosa and Oakhill Preschool México.

References

External links
 Instituto Cumbres México
 New website 

High schools in Mexico City
Cuajimalpa
Private schools in Mexico